Wally Albright (born Walton Algernon Albright Jr.; September 3, 1925 - August 7, 1999) was an American actor, water sportsman, and businessman. As a child actor, he was best known for his role in the Our Gang film series.

Career
The son of Wally and Lois Albright, he was born in Burbank, California. He was seen in a film with Gloria Swanson in 1928. He appeared in a number of films during his career, and is notable for appearing in six Our Gang short subjects throughout the early 1930s. Though his tenure with the gang was brief, his role was usually that of the gang leader alongside Matthew "Stymie" Beard.

Albright played so many roles as a baby that he was quite well-known by the time he was three. He appeared in the small parts of various films made by Hal Roach Studios. At the end of 1933, when Gus Meins took over directing, Our Gang needed a few new characters. Several older Our Gangers left the series in the summer of 1933, including Dorothy DeBorba and Bobby "Wheezer" Hutchins.

Albright would be one of several characters, including Scotty Beckett and Billie "Buckwheat" Thomas, to debut in 1934 in the Our Gang short Hi Neighbor. He ended up becoming one of the most prominent members of the gang. To the dismay of Hal Roach and director Gus Meins, Albright voluntarily left the gang and returned to a normal childhood life. However, he did play a small role in The Grapes of Wrath, appearing as an older child in a migrant camp. In the movie, Albright’s character lies to Ma Joad about having good food when eating fried dough like every other migrant at the camp.

Later years
In adult life, Albright became a champion water sportsman and eventually operated a successful trucking firm, shipping produce. He died in Sacramento, California on August 7, 1999. He is buried in the Garden of Ascension at Forest Lawn, Glendale, California.

Filmography

The Case of Lena Smith (1929) as Franz (age 3) (film debut)
Scandal (1929) as Bit Role (uncredited)
Thunder (1929) as Davey
Wonder of Women (1929) as Wulle-Wulle
The Single Standard (1929) – Arden's Son (uncredited)
The Trespasser (1929) as Jack Merrick
Song o' My Heart (1930) as Boy (uncredited)
The Prodigal (1931) as Peter
East Lynne (1931) as William as a Boy
Salvation Nell (1931) as Jimmy
Sob Sister (1931) as Billy Stotesley (uncredited)
Law of the Sea (1931) as Cole Andrews-as a child
The Silver Lining (1932) as Bobby O'Brien
Choo-Choo! (1932, Short) as Wally, an orphan
Rebecca of Sunnybrook Farm (1932) as Billy Randall (uncredited)
Thirteen Women (1932) as Bobby Stanhope
The Conquerors (1932) as Roger Standish – One of the Twins
End of the Trail (1932) as Jimmy 'Sonny' Travers
Grand Slam (1933) as Boy Bridge Player (uncredited)
Zoo in Budapest (1933) as Paul Vandor
The Wrecker (1933) as Young Boy
Ann Vickers (1933) as Mischa Feldermans (uncredited)
Smoky (1933) as Clint's Son (uncredited)
Mr. Skitch (1933) – Little Ira Skitch (uncredited)
As the Earth Turns (1934) as John
Hi'-Neighbor! (1934, Short) as Wally
Ever Since Eve (1934) as Child (uncredited)
For Pete's Sake! (1934, Short) as Wally
The First Round-Up (1934, Short) as Wally
Honky Donkey (1934, Short) as Wallace
The Count of Monte Cristo (1934) as Albert, Age 8 (uncredited)
You Belong to Me (1934) as Second Schoolboy (uncredited)
Washee Ironee (1934, Short) as Waldo
Kid Millions (1934) as Little Boy in Ice Cream Number (uncredited)
Black Fury (1935) as Willie Novak (uncredited)
The Affair of Susan (1935) as Boy on Stoop (uncredited)
O'Shaughnessy's Boy (1935) as Child (uncredited)
Waterfront Lady (1935) as Mickey O'Flaherty
Little Miss Nobody (1936) as Orphan (uncredited)
The Crime of Dr. Forbes (1936) as Crippled Boy (uncredited)
Who's Lonely Now (1935, Short) as Johnson's Son (uncredited) 
Star for a Night (1936) as Hans (uncredited)
The Cowboy Star (1936) as Jimmy Baker
Maid of Salem (1937) as Jasper (uncredited)
Old Louisiana (1937) as Davey
The Woman I Love (1937) as Georges
Captains Courageous (1937) as Boy (uncredited)
What Price Vengeance? (1937) as Sandy MacNair
Super-Sleuth (1937) as Teenage Fan (uncredited)
It Happened in Hollywood (1937) as Boy (uncredited)
Roll Along, Cowboy (1937) as Danny Blake
Sons of the Legion (1938) as Harold
King of the Sierras (1938) as Sonny Blake
Boy Trouble (1939) as Boy (uncredited)
Mexicali Rose (1939) as Tommy Romero
The Grapes of Wrath (1940)  as Boy Who Bragged of Eating Chicken (uncredited)
Johnny Apollo (1940) as Office Boy
Public Enemies (1941) as Tommy
A Yank at Eton (1942) as Boy in Locker Room (uncredited)
Junior Army (1942) as Student (uncredited)
Laura (1944) as Newsboy (uncredited)
The Enchanted Cottage (1945) as Soldier at Dance (uncredited)
The Wild One (1953) as Cyclist (uncredited)
Gypsy Colt (1954) as Don (uncredited)
White Christmas (1954) as Andy (uncredited) (final film role)

References

Bibliography
 Holmstrom, John. The Moving Picture Boy: An International Encyclopaedia from 1895 to 1995, Norwich, Michael Russell, 1996, p. 138-139.
 Dye, David. Child and Youth Actors: Filmography of Their Entire Careers, 1914-1985. Jefferson, NC: McFarland & Co., 1988, p. 4.

External links

American male child actors
Male actors from Burbank, California
1925 births
1999 deaths
20th-century American male actors
Burials at Forest Lawn Memorial Park (Glendale)
Our Gang